The Mên-an-Tol (Cornish: Men an Toll) is a small formation of standing stones in Cornwall, UK. It is about three miles northwest of Madron. It is also known locally as the "Crick Stone".

Location
The Mên-an-Tol stands near the Madron to Morvah road in Cornwall. Other antiquities in the vicinity include the Mên Scryfa inscribed stone about 300 metres to the north and the Boskednan stone circle less than 1 kilometre to the northeast.

Etymology
The name Men an Toll in Cornish means "the stone of the hole".

Description
The Mên-an-Tol consists of three upright granite stones: a round stone with its middle holed out with two standing stones to each side, in front of and behind the hole. When seen at an angle from one side, the stones form a three-dimensional "101".

The two side stones are both about 1.2 metres high. The westernmost stone was moved and brought into a straight line with the other two stones sometime after 1815. The holed stone is roughly octagonal in outline. It is 1.3 metres wide and 1.1 metres high; the circular hole is 0.5 m in diameter. The only other holed stone in Cornwall of this type is the Tolvan holed stone which can be seen in a garden near Helston.

There is one other standing stone nearby, and six recumbent stones, some of which are buried. A cairn exists as a low stony mound just to the southeast. There are two other early Bronze Age barrows or cairns between 120 and 150 metres to the north.

Interpretation
The Mên-an-Tol is thought to date to either the late Neolithic or early Bronze Age. The holed stone could originally have been a natural occurrence rather than deliberately sculpted.

The distribution of the stones around the site has led to the suggestion that the monument is actually part of a stone circle. If so, then it is likely that the stones have been rearranged at some point, and the two standing stones either side of the holed stone may have been moved from their original positions. It has also been suggested that the holed stone could have been a capstone for the nearby cairn before being moved to its present position.

History

In 1749 the site was first archaeologically investigated by William Borlase, who also drew a plan. This shows that the megaliths were not in a line like today, but formed an angle of about 135°. Borlase also reported that farmers had taken away some stones from the area. From him comes the first written record of the myths and rituals.

In the 19th Century the local antiquary John Thomas Blight published several drawings of the site, and made the first suggestion that the stones could be the remains of a stone circle. In 1872 William Copeland Borlase, a descendant of the earlier Borlase, gave a more detailed description of the area.

In 1932 Hugh O'Neill Hencken wrote the first modern archaeological report. He believed that the position of the stones was not the prehistoric arrangement, but had been significantly changed. He also thought that the holed stone might be part of a destroyed tomb. He was even told that local farmers with back or limb complaints would crawl through the hole to relieve their pain.

In 1993, the Cornwall Historic Environment Service published a detailed report with the latest research results. They suggested that the standing stones originated from a stone circle which consisted of 18 to 20 stones. The holed stone, however, could be part of a nearby portal tomb. It also possible that the holed stone stood at the center of the stone circle and served to frame specific points on the horizon. Such a use of a holed stone is not known in other sites, although the nearby stone circle of Boscawen-Un does have a central standing stone.

In folklore

Mên-an-Tol is supposed to have a fairy or piskie guardian who can make miraculous cures. In one story, a changeling baby was put through the stone in order for the mother to get the real child back. Evil piskies had changed her child, and the ancient stones were able to reverse their evil spell.

Local legend claims that if at full moon a woman passes through the holed stone seven times backwards, she will soon become pregnant. Another legend is that passage through the stone will cure a child of rickets (osteomalacia). For centuries, children with rickets were passed naked through the hole in the middle stone nine times.

Popular culture 

Many of the visitors to Mên-an-Tol have their photograph taken placing their heads through the central hole.

The Cornish poet D. M. Thomas referred to Mên-an-Tol as "the wind's vagina".

The song "Men-An-Tol" appears on the Zeitgeist album by the Levellers.

The Men-An-Tol also features prominently in the novel The Little Country by Charles de Lint.

"Mén-An-Tol" is the name of a level in the 2017 game Monument Valley 2.

"Mén-An-Tol" is a song on the 2018 album The Four Worlds by Mark Pritchard.

"Men an Toll" is a piece on the 2022 Cornish language album Tresor by Gwenno.

References

External links 

 The Mên-an-Tol at Megalithia.com
 Men-An-Tol site page on The Megalithic Portal
 Men-An-Tol site page on The Modern Antiquarian
 Legends of Cornwall's Stones, Gareth Evans, 2005
 Men-an-Tol at Historic Cornwall

Bronze Age sites in Cornwall
Megalithic monuments in England
Penwith
Tourist attractions in Cornwall
Stone Age sites in Cornwall